Luteovirus is a genus of viruses, in the family Tombusviridae. There are 13 species in this genus. Plants serve as natural hosts. The geographical distribution of Luteoviruses is widespread, with the virus primarily infecting plants via transmission by aphid vectors. The virus only replicates within the host cell and not within the vector . The name 'luteovirus' arises from the Latin luteus, which is translated as 'yellow'. Luteovirus was given this name due to the symptomatic yellowing of the plant that occurs as a result of infection.

Taxonomy
The genus contains the following species:
Apple associated luteovirus
Apple luteovirus 1
Barley yellow dwarf virus kerII
Barley yellow dwarf virus kerIII
Barley yellow dwarf virus MAV
Barley yellow dwarf virus PAS
Barley yellow dwarf virus PAV
Bean leafroll virus
Cherry associated luteovirus
Nectarine stem pitting associated virus
Red clover associated luteovirus
Rose spring dwarf-associated virus
Soybean dwarf virus

Morphology and genome structure
Viruses in Luteovirus are non-enveloped, with icosahedral and spherical geometries, and T=3 symmetry. The diameter is around 25-30 nm, with 32 capsomeres in each nucleocapsid. The nucleic acid content is around 28%. Luteovirus is a group IV virus according to the Baltimore classification of viruses. Each virion contains a single strand of (+) sense RNA. The genome is non-segmented, linear and between 5300 and 5900 nucleotides long. Notably, luteoviruses have two 5' open reading frames (ORFs) which are located upstream of the coat protein. One such ORF encodes an RNA-dependent RNA polymerase. Several other ORFs are present at the 3' terminus and are expressed from subgenomic RNA. Viruses in Luteovirus also lack polyadenylation at the 3' terminus.

Life cycle
Viral replication is cytoplasmic. Entry into the host cell is achieved by penetration into the host cell. Replication follows the positive stranded RNA virus replication model. Positive stranded RNA virus transcription is the method of transcription. Translation takes place by leaky scanning, -1 ribosomal frameshifting, and suppression of termination. The virus exits the host cell by tubule-guided viral movement. Plants serve as the natural host. The virus is transmitted via a vector (insects). Transmission routes are vector and mechanical.

See also
Beet yellow net virus

References

External links
 
 https://www.ncbi.nlm.nih.gov/ICTVdb/ICTVdB/39010000.htm
 http://www.dpvweb.net/notes/showgenus.php?genus=Luteovirus
 Viralzone: Luteovirus
 ICTV

Virus genera